Graham Tainton (born 17 September 1927 in South Africa) is a Swedish dancer and choreographer who came to Sweden in 1959 with a large music ensemble, The Golden City Dixies. He  married a Swede, and their oldest daughter Blossom Tainton-Lindquist was born in 1962. He is also the father of entertainment celebrities Kelly Tainton, Themba Tainton and David Tainton and a cousin of Miriam Makeba.

Tainton was ABBAs choreographer and has more recently appeared in UR's Living Room where he accounted for his early years in South Africa with Desmond Tutu as his priest and Nelson Mandela the lawyer who got him out of prison under apartheid. He has also been in the jury and appeared on a Swedish TV show called Floor Filler. In 2016 88-year-old Tainton was honored and interviewed on the popular Let's Dance (Swedish TV series).

External links

References 

South African choreographers
Swedish choreographers
1927 births
Living people
South African emigrants to Sweden